Gabriel Cherecheș (born 21 October 1977) is a Romanian diver. He competed at the 1992 Summer Olympics, the 1996 Summer Olympics and the 2000 Summer Olympics.

References

1977 births
Living people
Romanian male divers
Olympic divers of Romania
Divers at the 1992 Summer Olympics
Divers at the 1996 Summer Olympics
Divers at the 2000 Summer Olympics
Sportspeople from Bacău